Markus Koch (born February 13, 1963) is a German-born former American football defensive lineman in the National Football League for the Washington Redskins team which won a Super Bowl (1988). He played high school football at the Eastwood Collegiate Institute in Kitchener, Ontario and played college football at Boise State University.

Koch served as Vice President of the Seattle chapter of the National Football League Players Association (NFLPA).

Having finished his career before the internet age, Koch is overlooked by the media, which call Sebastian Vollmer of the Patriots the first German to be drafted (2nd, 2009) by the NFL and to win a Super Bowl.

College career
Koch was All American Football Player, Boise State 1982-85. For three consecutive years he was selected first-team All-Big Sky Conference (1983–85).

Professional career
In the 1986 NFL Draft Koch was selected in the 2nd round as the 30th overall pick by the Washington Redskins. He was also selected in the 1986 CFL Draft by the Toronto Argonauts.
Koch played in Super Bowl XXII, 1988 and was on injured reserved for Super Bowl XXVI, 1992.

Koch injured his knee during the October 6, 1991 20-7 victory over the Chicago Bears and was replaced by Jason Buck. This would be the last time Koch played in the NFL.

Koch was inducted into the Boise State Hall of Fame in 1993.

Life After Football
After spending six years in the National Football League Koch received his License Massage Practitioner, Craniosacral Therapist, Acupressure Therapist, Reflexologist, Certified Yoga Instructor, Vipassana Meditation Instructor and uses modalities of Acupressure, Life Coaching, Energy Work, Massage Therapy, Reflexology. He works with his wife at Holistic PT holisticpt.us in Port Townsend, WA. 

Koch and his wife Amy were featured in "The Crazy Wisdom Journal" for their massage therapy work.   Markus and Amy guide yearly retreats to Brazil.

Personal life
Koch currently lives in Port Townsend, Washington.

References

1963 births
Living people
German players of American football
American football defensive linemen
Boise State Broncos football players
Washington Redskins players